Type 77 can refer to:
Type 77 armored personnel carrier, an armored personnel carrier developed by China.
Type 77 tractor, a tracked tractor based on Type 77 armored personnel carrier.
Type 77 pistol, Chinese pistol.
Type 77 Heavy Machine Gun, Chinese 12.7×108mm heavy machine gun featuring an indigenous design